San Francisco Ballet is the oldest ballet company in the United States, founded in 1933 as the San Francisco Opera Ballet under the leadership of ballet master Adolph Bolm. The company is currently based in the War Memorial Opera House, San Francisco, and effective December 2022 under the direction of Tamara Rojo. It is among the world's leading dance companies, presenting more than 100 performances annually, with a repertoire that spans both classical and contemporary ballet. Along with American Ballet Theatre and the New York City Ballet, San Francisco Ballet has been described as part of the "triumvirate of great classical companies defining the American style on the world stage today".

History

Founding: Christensen brothers

Willam Christensen, Harold Christensen, and Lew Christensen made up the famed trio of brothers considered by many to have done more than anyone else to establish ballet in the United States. Born into an artistic and musical family, the three brothers studied folk dance and ballet from early ages and went on to tour the famous vaudeville Orpheum Circuit during the 1920s and 1930s, exposing many Americans to ballet for the first time with their act "The Christ Brothers".

As vaudeville faded from American popular culture, Harold and Lew joined George Balanchine's new company, American Ballet, in 1935. In 1932, Willam formed a ballet school in Portland, Oregon; in 1937, he was engaged as principal male soloist by San Francisco Opera Ballet. He became the company's ballet master and choreographer in 1938. With his brother Harold, he purchased the company from the Opera in 1942, renaming it San Francisco Ballet. In 1951, Willam retired as director of SF Ballet and moved to Utah, where he started teaching ballet in the country's first university ballet department at the University of Utah. With a group of his students, he founded the Utah Civic Ballet (now known as Ballet West) in 1963; the company remained under Christensen's directorship until 1978.

Under Balanchine's tutelage at American Ballet, Lew Christensen became the first American-born danseur noble. The United States Army drafted Christensen to fight in World War II. After the war ended, he joined Balanchine's and Lincoln Kirstein's Ballet Society (soon to become New York City Ballet), eventually becoming ballet master; he served in the role from 1946 until 1950. In 1951, he joined his brother Willam as co-director of San Francisco Ballet. When Willam moved to Salt Lake City later that year, Lew took over as full director of SF Ballet; he held the position until 1976, when Michael Smuin joined him as co-director. Lew Christensen remained SF Ballet co-director until 1984, the year of his death.

After leaving the vaudeville circuit in 1935, Harold Christensen danced with American Ballet, San Francisco Opera Ballet, Kirstein's Ballet Caravan, and San Francisco Ballet until his retirement from the stage in 1946. In 1940, his brother Willam invited him to become director of the San Francisco Ballet School, and in 1942 he and Willam purchased the SF Ballet. Harold continued to serve as the school's director until his retirement in 1975.

1938–1950

In 1938, the company's first major production was Coppélia, choreographed by Willam Christensen. In 1940, it staged Swan Lake, the first time that the ballet was produced in its entirety by an American company. On Christmas Eve 1944, the company staged Nutcracker—the first complete production of Tchaikovsky's most popular piece ever danced in the United States.

In 1942, San Francisco Opera Ballet split into two independent companies, ballet and opera. The ballet half was sold to Willam and Harold Christensen. Willam became artistic director, while Harold took on the job of director of the San Francisco Ballet School. The San Francisco Ballet Guild was also formed as a support organization for San Francisco Ballet.

1951–1972
The year 1951 marked a significant shift in administration of San Francisco Ballet. Lew Christensen—premier danseur at the time—partnered with his brother Willam Christensen as co-directors. Then in 1952, Lew Christensen took over as sole director. Under his guidance, San Francisco Ballet began to travel and establish itself as a significant American ballet company. Until 1956, San Francisco Ballet had remained on the West Coast, but Christensen took the company to the Jacob's Pillow Dance Festival in Massachusetts. In 1957, it was the first American ballet company to tour the Far East, performing in 11 Asian nations. On New Year's Day 1965, ABC-TV televised a one-hour abridgement of the Lew Christensen-choreographed production of Nutcracker featuring San Francisco Ballet.

In 1972, San Francisco's War Memorial Opera House was named the official residence of San Francisco Ballet.

1973–1985
In 1973, Michael Smuin became co-artistic director of San Francisco Ballet with Lew Christensen; Smuin had danced with the Company from 1953 to 1961. Under his direction, the national and international profile of SF Ballet was raised significantly by the broad success of productions such as 1977's Romeo and Juliet, which aired on the PBS series Great Performances: Dance in America in 1978. This televised performance marked the first time that a West Coast ballet company, and a full-length ballet, was shown on the PBS TV series. PBS televised three more of Smuin's SF Ballet productions, and his productions of The Tempest and A Song for Dead Warriors went on to win Emmy Awards. Smuin led the company until 1985.

1985–present

Helgi Tomasson's 1985 arrival as artistic director marked the beginning of a new era for San Francisco Ballet. Under Tomasson's direction, San Francisco Ballet has been recognized as one of the most innovative ballet companies in the world due to its early and frequent commissioning of new works by aspiring choreographers around the globe, the breadth of its repertory—spanning classical ballet, neoclassical ballet, and contemporary ballet—and the diversity of its company members. The Financial Times noted in 2012, "Tomasson ... helped shatter the distinction between the US top companies and so-called 'regional companies.

Over a span of more than 25 years, Tomasson has staged acclaimed full-length productions of classics including Swan Lake (1988, 2009); The Sleeping Beauty (1990); Romeo and Juliet (1994); Giselle (1999); Don Quixote, co-staged with former principal dancer and current choreographer in residence Yuri Possokhov (2003); and Nutcracker (2004). Tomasson's Nutcracker, set in San Francisco during the 1915 Panama Pacific International Exposition, is notable for being the only uniquely San Francisco Nutcracker. It features sets (including "a backdrop of San Francisco's Victorian houses known as 'painted ladies) and costumes created by, respectively, Michael Yeargan and Martin Pakledinaz, both repeat Tony Award-winning designers. Upon its premiere, The New York Times called Tomasson's Nutcracker "striking, elegant and beautiful".

Today, San Francisco Ballet presents approximately 100 performances each year. The company's diverse repertory includes works by Sir Frederick Ashton, George Balanchine, David Bintley, August Bournonville, Val Caniparoli, Lew Christensen, Nacho Duato, Jorma Elo, William Forsythe, James Kudelka, Jirí Kylián, Serge Lifar, Lar Lubovitch, Wayne McGregor, Agnes de Mille, Sir Kenneth MacMillan, Hans van Manen, Peter Martins, Mark Morris, Rudolf Nureyev, Marius Petipa, Roland Petit, Yuri Possokhov, Alexei Ratmansky, Jerome Robbins, Liam Scarlett, Paul Taylor, Helgi Tomasson, Antony Tudor, and Christopher Wheeldon.

In 2010, the Ballet's opening-night gala, Silver Celebration, honored Tomasson's 25 years as artistic director.

The Gala Opening of San Francisco Ballet's 80th Season included Tarantella pas de deux, L'Arlesienne solo, Flower Festival at Genzano pas de deux, In the Passerine's Clutch, Raymonda’s Act II solo, Trio second movement, Don Quixote grand pas de deux, Onegin Act 1 pas de deux, Stars and Stripes pas de deux, After the Rain pas de deux, and excerpts from Suite en Blanc.

San Francisco Ballet's 2013 season included Trio, Ghost and Borderlands as well as Suite en blanc, In the night, Nijinsky, The Rite of Spring, Onegin, Raymonda Act III and Cinderella.

The 2014 season included Giselle, A Midsummer Night's Dream, Tears, Borderlands, From Foreign Lands, Firebird, Ghosts, The Kingdom of the Shades from La Bayadère, Cinderella, Shostakovich Trilogy, Caprice, Maelstrom, The Rite of Spring, Hummingbird, The Fifth Season, Suite en Blanc, Agon, Brahms-Schoenberg Quartet, and Glass Pieces.

The 2015 season included Serenade, RAkU, Lambarena, Giselle, The Vertiginous Thrill of Exactitude, Variations for Two Couples, Manifesto, The Kingdom of the Shades from La Bayadère, Act II, Dances at a Gathering, Hummingbird, Don Quixote, Shostakovich Trilogy, Caprice, Swimmer, and Romeo & Juliet.

The 2017 season included "Haffner Symphony," "Fragile Vessels," "In the Countenance of Kings," "Seven Sonatas," "Optimistic Tragedy," "Pas/Parts 2016," "Frankenstein," "Stravinsky Violin Concerto," "Prodigal Son," "Diamonds," "Fusion," "Salome," "Fearful Symmetries," "Swan Lake," "Trio," "Ghost in the Machine," "Within the Golden Hour,"  and "Cinderella."

In January 2021, Tomasson announced that he will retire from the company at the end of 2022. In January 2022, it was announced that Tamara Rojo will succeed Tomasson.

Programming
San Francisco Ballet performs repertory from January through May at the War Memorial Opera House in San Francisco. In addition, the company performs in July at the Stern Grove Festival in San Francisco, tours nationally in the summer and fall, and presents Nutcracker in December at the War Memorial Opera House.

Festivals and touring
In 1991, San Francisco Ballet performed in New York City for the first time in 26 years, returning in 1993, 1995, 1998, 2002, 2006, 2008, and 2013. Following the initial tour, The New York Times proclaimed, "Mr. Tomasson has accomplished the unprecedented: He has pulled a so-called regional company into the national ranks, and he has done so by honing the dancers into a classical style of astonishing verve and purity. San Francisco Ballet under Helgi Tomasson's leadership is one of the spectacular success stories of the arts in America."

In May 1995, San Francisco Ballet hosted 12 ballet companies from around the world for UNited We Dance: An International Festival. The festival commemorated the 50th anniversary of the signing of the United Nations Charter, which took place at the San Francisco War Memorial and Performing Arts Center.

In fall 2008, as part of the company's 75th anniversary celebration, San Francisco Ballet embarked on a critically acclaimed four-city American tour with engagements at Chicago's Harris Theater for Music and Dance, New York City Center, Southern California's Segerstrom Center for the Arts, and the John F. Kennedy Center for the Performing Arts in Washington, D.C. The year culminated in a New Works Festival of world premieres by 10 of the dance world's most acclaimed choreographers—Julia Adam, Val Caniparoli, Jorma Elo, Margaret Jenkins, James Kudelka, Mark Morris, Yuri Possokhov, Paul Taylor, Stanton Welch, and Christopher Wheeldon. Other anniversary initiatives included a commemorative book, San Francisco Ballet at Seventy-Five, and the broadcast of Tomasson's Nutcracker in December 2008 on the Great Performances: Dance in America series on PBS, produced in partnership with KQED Public Television in San Francisco.

San Francisco Ballet also performed in frequent overseas tours, including engagements at prestigious venues such as the famed Opéra de Paris-Palais Garnier in Paris (1994, 2001); London's Sadler's Wells Theatre (1999, 2004, 2012) and Royal Opera House in Covent Garden (2002); Athens' Megaron Theatre (2002) and Herod Atticus Amphitheatre (2004); Copenhagen's Tivoli Gardens (1998, 2010); and the Edinburgh International Festival at the Edinburgh Playhouse (1997, 2003). In fall 2009, San Francisco Ballet made its first trip to the People's Republic of China, with performances in Shanghai and Beijing.

In 2012, San Francisco Ballet embarked on the longest tour in the company's history, with engagements in London and Washington, DC, as well as first-time visits to Hamburg, Germany; Moscow; and Sun Valley, Idaho.

Broadcast and media projects
In 1978, San Francisco Ballet's Michael Smuin-directed production of Romeo and Juliet became the first production by a West Coast ballet company, and the first full-length ballet, to be aired by the PBS Great Performances: Dance in America television series. Under the direction of Smuin, the ballet's 1981 production of The Tempest became the first ballet to be broadcast live (on PBS) from the War Memorial Opera House. Three years later, the 1984 PBS broadcast of the Ballet's performance of A Song for Dead Warriors earned Smuin an Emmy.

The fruitful relationship between PBS and SF Ballet continues to this day, with regular broadcasts of the Ballet's 2007 production of Nutcracker, choreographed by Helgi Tomasson. I Also in 2007, the Company had its first theatrical release with Nutcracker, shown in limited theaters in Canada, Australia, and the U.S. In 2011, theatrical distributor IndieNetFilms arranged for additional screenings throughout the U.S. and Canada.

In December 2011, the U.S. premiere of John Neumeier's The Little Mermaid, performed by San Francisco Ballet, was broadcast nationally on PBS's Great Performances: Dance in America, and also internationally. DVDs of the Nutcracker and The Little Mermaid performances were released in 2008 and 2011, respectively. CD recordings of the complete score of Nutcracker and Shinji Eshima's RAkU were released in 2010 and 2012, respectively.

Accolades and awards
The company has garnered numerous accolades and awards. In 2005, San Francisco Ballet won its first Laurence Olivier Award, in the category of Outstanding Achievement in Dance, for its 2004 fall season at Sadler's Wells Theatre. Of the engagement, London's The Sunday Times proclaimed, "Helgi Tomasson's outstanding artistic direction ... has transformed a regional American troupe into one of the world's top ballet companies." In 2006, in a readers' poll conducted by Dance Europe magazine, San Francisco Ballet was the first non-European company to be voted "Company of the Year". In 2008, San Francisco Ballet received the Jerome Robbins Award for excellence in dance.

In 2012, Helgi Tomasson was named recipient of the Dance/USA Honor, acknowledging individuals' contributions to dance in America and the role they play in the national dance community. Most recently, San Francisco Ballet was nominated in the category of Outstanding Company by the 2014 National Dance Awards, based in the U.K.

Company
The company of the San Francisco Ballet, as of September 2017.

Artistic Director
Helgi Tomasson

Ballet Masters & Assistants to the Artistic Director
 Ricardo Bustamante
 Felipe Diaz

Ballet Masters

 Tina LeBlanc
 Anita Paciotti
 Katita Waldo

Choreographer In Residence
Yuri Possokhov

Company teachers
Helgi Tomasson
Patrick Armand
Ricardo Bustamante
Felipe Diaz

Principal dancers

Principal character dancers

Ricardo Bustamante

Val Caniparoli

Anita Paciotti

Soloists

Cavan Conley
Diego Cruz
Daniel Deivison-Oliveira
Isabella DeVivo
Lucas Erni
Ellen Rose Hummel

Jasmine Jimison 
Madison Keesler
Norika Matsuyama
Steven Morse
Sasha Mukhamedov
Elizabeth Powell

Julia Rowe
Henry Sidford
Myles Thatcher
Lonnie Weeks
Hansuke Yamamoto

Corps de ballet

Kamryn Baldwin
Sean Bennett
Ludmila Bizalion
Samantha Bristow
Olivia Brothers
Thamires Chuvas
Rubén Citores
Estéban Cuadrado 
Megan Amanda Ehrlich
Luca Ferrò
Gabriela González
Lleyton Ho

Anatalia Hordov
Blake Johnston
Sunmin Lee
Elizabeth Mateer
Carmela Mayo
Swane Messaoudi
Davide Occhipinti
Lauren Parrott
Joshua Jack Price

Leili Rackow
Nathaniel Remez
Alexander Reneff-Olson
Jacob Seltzer
Natasha Sheehan
John-Paul Simoens
Tyla Steinbach
Mingxuan Wang
Joseph Warton
Maggie Weirich
Adrian Zeisel

Apprentices 
 Alexis Aiudi
 Juliana Bellissimo
 Andris Kundzins
 Nicole Moyer
 Pemberley Ann Olson
 Jamie Adele Stephens
 Jonathan Teague
 Alexis Valdes

Official school
San Francisco Ballet School, San Francisco Ballet's official school, is America's oldest ballet school. The program includes classes in technique, pointe work, pas de deux, men's technique, contemporary dance, floor barre/conditioning, and character dance. Male and female students are placed in divisions according to age, experience, and ability. More than 50 percent of current San Francisco Ballet dancers received some training at San Francisco Ballet School.

History and directors
The school was founded in 1933 as part of the San Francisco Operatic and Ballet School when Gaetano Merola, the founder of the San Francisco Opera, perceived a need for an institution where dancers could be trained to perform in opera productions. The school was under the direction of ballet director Adolph Bolm from 1933 to 1938. Willam Christensen became director from 1938 to 1940, followed by his brother Harold Christensen from 1942 until 1975. Richard L. Cammack directed the school from 1975 to 1985; he oversaw the move to its current state-of-the-art facilities on Franklin Street in 1983. In 1985, new SF Ballet artistic director Helgi Tomasson appointed Nancy Johnson as school head. Lola de Avila joined as associate director from 1993 to 1999, followed by Gloria Govrin beginning in 1999. In 2006, de Avila returned to serve as associate director until 2012, when Patrick Armand stepped into the role.

School programs
Admission into the school is by audition only. Students may apply for financial aid and merit-based scholarships. Advanced students may be invited to join the SFBS Trainee Program, a one- to two-year pre-professional program established in 2004.

Up to 150 students are chosen by audition to dance in the yearly SF Ballet production of Nutcracker. The most advanced students may also dance with SF Ballet in the repertory season.

The school also runs a pre-ballet program for children ages 4–7; after completing the program, students of age who wish to continue study must audition in order to continue at the school.

Faculty
The faculty of the San Francisco Ballet School has long been known for its excellence and diversity of background. As of January 2017, it is led by the Artistic Director Helgi Tómasson and Director Patrick Armand. The illustrious faculty includes Patrick Armand, Cecelia Beam, Sandrine Cassini, Kristi DeCaminada, Karen Gabay, Jeffrey Lyons, Rubén Martín Cintas, Ilona McHugh, Pascal Molat (Trainee Program Assistant), Anne-Sophie Rodriguez, Jaime Diaz (Strengthening), Dexandro "D" Montalvo (Contemporary), Brian Fisher (Contemporary), Dana Genshaft (Contemporary dance and conditioning), Henry Berg (Conditioning), Leonid Shagalov (Character), Jamie Narushchen (Music), and Daniel Sullivan (Music). The guest faculty for 2017 includes Sofiane Sylve (Principal Guest).

San Francisco Ballet Orchestra
Founded in 1975 to serve as San Francisco Ballet's official permanent orchestra, San Francisco Ballet Orchestra (SFBO) holds the rare position of being one of three major orchestras in a single city. The orchestra debuted at the end of 1975 with Nutcracker and has met with both audience and critical acclaim ever since, becoming known by the 1990s as one of the world's finest ballet orchestras.

SFBO toured with the SF Ballet's touring company from 1978 until 1984. It has accompanied many prestigious international ballet companies that have toured to the San Francisco Bay Area, including The Royal Ballet, the Royal Danish Ballet, Stuttgart Ballet, Hamburg Ballet,the Bolshoi Ballet, Paul Taylor Dance Company, American Ballet Theatre, and the Paris Opéra Ballet. In 1995, the orchestra took on the remarkable task of accompanying 13 international dance companies over the space of a single week in the UNited We Dance Festival.

The 49-member orchestra accompanies SF Ballet throughout its winter and spring repertory seasons. It also performs apart from the Company; it debuted solely as an orchestra in 1979 at the Herbst Theatre in San Francisco's War Memorial Veterans Building, playing a program that included works by Haydn, Ives, and Vivaldi.

Orchestra staff and musicians
The SFBO is composed of 49 members and headed by Martin West, music director and conductor. Founding Concertmaster and solo violinist Roy Malan retired in December, 2014, after serving for 40 years. After a rigorous search, Cordula Merks was appointed Concertmaster in 2016. As of October 2013, the musicians and staff included:

San Francisco Ballet Orchestra music directors
The orchestra was led by Denis de Coteau from 1975 until 1998, when de Coteau's battle with terminal cancer forced him to step down from the position. Emil de Cou, who had been serving as conductor since 1995, then assumed the role of music director, leading the Orchestra until 2001, when he left to join Washington D.C.'s National Symphony Orchestra. He was replaced by first associate conductor Jean-Louis LeRoux, who then left the interim position in 2003 and was succeeded by Andrew Mogrelia. In 2005, Mogrelia left in order to focus on his duties as music director at San Francisco Conservatory of Music. That same year, Martin West, frequent guest conductor for the Orchestra, stepped into the position of music director. In 2018 frequent guest conductor Ming Luke was appointed Principal Guest Conductor.

San Francisco Ballet Orchestra recordings
The orchestra's repertoire includes hundreds of works spanning four centuries of musical history, many of which have been recorded and released to great critical acclaim, including works by Beethoven, Bizet, and Delibes. Four of the orchestra's recordings have been televised on PBS's Great Performances: Dance in America.

Recordings include:

Othello—Suite from the Ballet by Eliot Goldenthal (Varese Records)
Tchaikovsky: Nutcracker (O'Brien Enterprises), 1988
Schoenberg, Spohr, Elgar, Handel: Works for String Quartet & Orchestra (Arabesque Records)
Claude Debussy: Rediscovered, Premiere Orchestral Recordings (Arabesque Records)
RAkU (San Francisco Ballet Records)
The Tempest—complete ballet by Paul Chihara: SF Ballet Orchestra recorded this under the name "Performing Arts Orchestra" in 1981 (Reference Recordings)
Nutcracker Op. 71 (Koch Int'l Classics)
Russian Masterpieces for Cello and Orchestra (Shostakovich Cello Concert, Tchaikovsky Rococo Variations, etc., Zuill Bailey, Cello) (Telarc)
Delibes— Coppélia/Sylvia Extended Suites from the Ballets (Reference Recordings)
Weber—Clarinet Concerti No. 1 & 2 (Alexander Fiterstein, Clarinet), (Bridge Records)
Beethoven—Triple Concerto in C Major, Opus 56, Piano Trio in E-flat Major, Op. 1 No. 1 (Claremont Piano Trio), (Bridge Records)
Bizet—Symphony in C major; Jeux D'Enfants; Variations chromatique (Reference Records)
Yeston—Tom Sawyer—A Ballet in Three Acts (PS Classics)
Karpman - Ask Your Mama - musical setting of Langston Hughes' Ask Your Mama: Twelve Moods for Jazz (Avie Records)
Winger - Conversations With Nijinsky, Ghosts, A Parting Grace'' (VBI Classic Recording)

Volunteer groups
San Francisco Ballet has a large network of volunteers who assist with the ongoing success of the Company and the San Francisco Ballet School.

More than 200 Ballet Resource and Volunteer Organization (BRAVO) volunteers donate over 10,000 volunteer hours every year, assisting with office duties, retail work, and the ballet's Center for Dance Education, as well as helping SF Ballet staff with receptions, fundraisers, the Spring Student Showcase, and other special events.

The San Francisco Ballet Auxiliary is a group of 100 dedicated women who volunteer to raise over $1 million in net contributions annually. In addition to individual fundraising, the group produces three annual productions: the Opening Night Gala, Fashion Show, and Student Showcase, with proceeds benefiting the Ballet and the San Francisco Ballet School.

San Francisco Ballet's Allegro Circle is a group of professional men and women who share a passion for dance and contribute their own personal, professional, and philanthropic resources toward developing a new and diverse generation of subscribers and patrons.

San Francisco Ballet's ENCORE! group offers local young professionals access to a range of social and educational events with a behind-the-scenes perspective. Staffing these events presents its 200+ members with a wide range of volunteer opportunities.

Repertory

See also
List of productions of Swan Lake derived from its 1895 revival

References

Further reading

Articles

External links

Official San Francisco Ballet School website
San Francisco Ballet YouTube Channel
San Francisco Ballet Facebook Page
San Francisco Ballet on Twitter
Stories about San Francisco Ballet in San Francisco's 7x7 magazine
Archival footage of San Francisco Ballet performing Balanchine's Concerto Barocco in 1956 at Jacob's Pillow
Archival footage of San Francisco Ballet performing Balanchine's Apollon musagète (Apollo) in 1956 at Jacob's Pillow

 
Ballet companies in the United States
Culture of San Francisco
Dance in California
History of ballet
Music venues in San Francisco
Non-profit organizations based in San Francisco
Arts organizations based in the San Francisco Bay Area
Arts organizations established in 1933
Performing groups established in 1933
1933 establishments in California